The seventh season of The Real Housewives of New Jersey, an American reality television series, premiered on July 10, 2016, and is broadcast on Bravo. It is primarily filmed in North Jersey; its executive producers are Rebecca Toth Diefenbach, Valerie Haselton, Lucilla D'Agostino, Jim Fraenkel, Omid Kahangi, Caroline Self, and Andy Cohen.

The Real Housewives of New Jersey focuses on the lives of returning cast members Teresa Giudice, Melissa Gorga, and Jacqueline Laurita; Laurita returned after leaving the series during season 6. Former cast members Kathy Wakile, Rosie Pierri, Nicole Napolitano and Teresa Aprea appeared periodically throughout the season. Former housewives, Aprea, Napolitano and Marchese were replaced by new cast members Dolores Catania and Siggy Flicker.

Production and crew

The Real Housewives of New Jersey was officially renewed for its seventh season on February 8, 2016. Rebecca Toth Diefenbach, Valerie Haselton, Lucilla D'Agostino, Jim Fraenkel, Omid Kahangi, Caroline Self, Andy Cohen and Tess Gamboa Meyers are recognized as the series' executive producers; it is produced and distributed by Sirens Media.

Cast and synopsis
The seventh season was announced in May, after having a nearly 2-year hiatus. Dina Manzo, who had previously returned for Season 6 after a three-season hiatus did not film this season due to geographic reasons, as she no longer lives in the Garden State. One season stars Amber Marchese and twins Nicole and Teresa made their departures as well, however made a guest appearance, making Teresa Giudice and Melissa Gorga the only full-time cast members to return from Season 6. Jacqueline Laurita, who departed from the show after the fifth season, returned. Siggy Flicker and Dolores Catania joined the cast for the seventh season. Kathy Wakile and Rosie Pierri featured as friends of the housewives.  Robyn Levy, Christina Flores and Kim DePaola also made guest appearances.

This season focuses on the return of Teresa Giudice from her eleven-month prison sentence as she slowly readjusts to life as a free woman, and back to being the wife and mother she always was. It also focuses on her attempts to repair fractured relationships with the Gorga's and friend Jacqueline.

Episodes

References

External links

2016 American television seasons
New Jersey (season 7)